Gabriel Ferreyra (born February 3, 1994) is an Argentine footballer who plays for Boca Juniors as a midfielder.

Early years
Gabriel Ferreyra was born on February 3, 1994, in Cañuelas, Argentina

1994 births
Living people
Association football midfielders
Boca Juniors footballers
AIK Fotboll players
Allsvenskan players
Argentine footballers
Argentine expatriate footballers
Expatriate footballers in Sweden
21st-century Argentine people